The 2015–16 Charlotte 49ers women's basketball team represents the University of North Carolina at Charlotte during the 2015–16 NCAA Division I women's basketball season. The 49ers, led by fourth year head coach Cara Consuegra, play their home games at Dale F. Halton Arena and were members of Conference USA. They finished the season 19–12, 12–8 in C-USA play to finish fourth place. They lost in the quarterfinals of the C-USA women's tournament to Old Dominion. They were invited to the Women's National Invitation Tournament where they lost to Wake Forest in the first round.

Roster

Rankings

Schedule

|-
!colspan=9 style="background:#00703C; color:#FFFFFF;"| Exhibition

|-
!colspan=9 style="background:#00703C; color:#FFFFFF;"| Non-conference regular season

|-
!colspan=9 style="background:#00703C; color:#FFFFFF;"| Conference USA regular season

|-
!colspan=9 style="background:#00703C; color:#FFFFFF;"| Conference USA Women's Tournament

|-
!colspan=9 style="background:#00703C; color:#FFFFFF;"| WNIT

See also
2015–16 Charlotte 49ers men's basketball team

References

Charlotte 49ers women's basketball seasons
Charlotte
2016 Women's National Invitation Tournament participants